Débété (also spelled Dabélé) is a town in the far north of Ivory Coast. It is a sub-prefecture of Tengréla Department in Bagoué Region, Savanes District. Less than two kilometres northwest of town is a border crossing with Mali.

Débété was a commune until March 2012, when it became one of 1126 communes nationwide that were abolished.

In 2014, the population of the sub-prefecture of Débété was 5,751.

Villages
The 5 villages of the sub-prefecture of Débété and their population in 2014 are:
 Beniasso (1 171)
 Debete (3 211)
 Kouroukoro (366)
 Nianrangba (714)
 Sirakoro (289)

Notes

Sub-prefectures of Bagoué
Ivory Coast–Mali border crossings
Former communes of Ivory Coast